The Greek Water Polo Super Cup is a Water Polo club competition in Greece since 1996. It is an annual match contested between the Water Polo Champion of the Greek League and the Cup’s Winner. The matches take place in different cities every year. The competition was held for three consecutive years, between 1996-98. The next years the competition stopped, and it restarted in 2018. Olympiacos has the most cups, and Vouliagmeni follows.

The matches

Performance by club

References

External links
Hellenic Swimming Federation 

 Water polo competitions in Greece